Alma is a settlement in the Xanthi regional unit of Greece. It is part of the community of Myki.

Populated places in Xanthi (regional unit)